Solar power in Minnesota expanded significantly in the early 2010s as a result of the cost decrease of photovoltaics and favorable policies. By 2016, it began to grow quickly.

In 1983, Minnesota adopted a net metering rule which allows customers generating up to 40 kW to use net metering, with the kilowatt-hour surplus rolled over each month, or optionally credited at the retail rate.

In May 2013, the Minnesota legislature adopted a mandate on investor-owned utilities in the state that requires them to produce 1.5% of their electricity from solar power by 2020 with the bill also raising the state's cap on net metering from 40 kW to 1 MW. This mandate is in addition to the state's renewable portfolio standard of 25% by 2025 and it is estimated that affected utilities will have to add 450 MW of solar by 2020 to comply with the 1.5% requirement.

While Minnesota is currently developing several utility level projects, currently, Minnesota's largest solar array is the North Star Solar Project in North Branch, Minnesota. With more than 440,000 solar panels, its output is more than 100MW. Other large arrays include the 62MW Marshall Solar Energy Project, completed in January 2017, a 2MW solar array in Slayton followed by a 1 MW array at an IKEA in Bloomington. There is also a 600 kW array on the roof of the Minneapolis Convention Center,. In January 2015, Ecolab announced it would be going 100% solar powered by purchasing power from community solar gardens to be built by SunEdison. Ecolab's share of the power would be 16MW, more than the amount of solar power in the state at the time of the announcement. If completely subscribed the solar gardens could provide up to 200MW. The Aurora Solar Project is a similar distributed network of arrays planned to reach 100MW utilizing midsized 2MW-10MW installations throughout the southern half of the state. The 62MW Marshall Solar Energy Project is proposed to be built on 500 acres near Marshall, Minnesota. Already home to the state's largest array, Chisago County, Minnesota has seven additional arrays in various stages of completion, earning it the nickname the solar capitol of Minnesota. When finished they will generate roughly 29 MW. 

Minnesota has the potential to generate 38.5% of its electricity from rooftop solar, from 23,100 MW of solar panels. St. Paul can generate 27% of its electricity, using 800 MW, and Minneapolis 26% from 1,000 MW.

As of 2021, the average installation cost for solar panels is $3.07 per watt.  Minnesota gets about 4 peak sun hours per day, so a 5 kW system can be expected to produce 7,300 kWh of energy per year and cost an average of $15,350.

Statistics

See also
List of power stations in Minnesota#Solar
Wind power in Minnesota
Solar power in the United States
Renewable energy in the United States

References

External links

 Minnesota Department of Commerce
 SEIA, Minnesota Solar Profile
 Minnesota Solar Energy Industries Association
 Incentives and Policies

Energy in Minnesota
Minnesota